Hindsiclava is a genus of sea snails, marine gastropod mollusks in the family Pseudomelatomidae,

Description
Hindsiclava is characterized by strong axial ribs and cords, giving the surface of the shell a reticulate appearance. They all have a well-developed anal node of callus, appearing only in adult specimens.

Distribution
This genus is only known from the New World in its fossil and Recent species.

Species
Species within the genus Hindsiclava include:
 Hindsiclava alesidota (Dall, 1889)
 Hindsiclava andromeda (Dall, 1919)
 † Hindsiclava antealesidota (Mansfield, 1930)  
 Hindsiclava appelii (Weinkauff & Kobelt, 1876)
 † Hindsiclava blountensis (Mansfield, 1935)
 † Hindsiclava calligonoides (Gardner, 1938)  
 † Hindsiclava caroniana (Maury, 1925) 
 Hindsiclava consors (Sowerby I, 1850)
 † Hindsiclava eupora (Dall, 1915)
 † Hindsiclava henekeni (Sowerby I, 1850) 
 Hindsiclava hertleini Emerson & Radwin, 1969
 † Hindsiclava ignorata Frassinetti & Covacevich, 1995
 Hindsiclava jungi (Macsotay & Campos Villarroel, 2001)
 Hindsiclava macilenta (Dall, 1889)
 Hindsiclava militaris (Reeve, 1843)
 †  Hindsiclava perspirata (Dall, 1890) 
 Hindsiclava polytorta (Dall, 1881)
 †  Hindsiclava paraconsors (Gardner, 1938) 
 † Hindsiclava pyrgoma Woodring, 1970 
 Hindsiclava resina (Dall, 1908)
 Hindsiclava rosenstielanus Tippett, 2007
 Hindsiclava tippetti Petuch, 1987
  †  Hindsiclava wiedenmayeri Landau, Da Silva & Heitz, 2016
Species brought into synonymy
 Hindsiclava chazaliei (Dautzenberg, 1900): synonym of Crassispira chazaliei (Dautzenberg, 1900)
 Hindsiclava dotella Dall, 1908: synonym of Hindsiclava militaris (Hinds, in Reeve, 1843)
 Hindsiclava notilla Dall, 1919 : synonym of Hindsiclava militaris (Hinds, in Reeve, 1843)
 Hindsiclava torquifer Berry, 1958: synonym of Hindsiclava andromeda (Dall, 1919)

References

+ Hertlein, Leo George, et al. "Marine mollusks collected during the" Askoy" Expedition to Panama, Colombia, and Ecuador in 1941. Bulletin of the AMNH; v. 107, article 2." (1955).

External links
 
 Bouchet, P.; Kantor, Y. I.; Sysoev, A.; Puillandre, N. (2011). A new operational classification of the Conoidea (Gastropoda). Journal of Molluscan Studies. 77(3): 273-308
 Worldwide Mollusc Species Data Base: Pseudomelatomidae

 
Pseudomelatomidae
Gastropod genera